The Dr. Pellie G. Graves House, at 301 N 4th St. in Scottsville, Kentucky, was built in 1917. It was listed on the National Register of Historic Places in 2001.

It was built before 1909.  It is a two-story building, with elements of Craftsman and Prairie styling.

It was home and a doctor's office of Dr. Pellie G. Graves (d. 1925).  Pellie and his brother Dr. Lattie Graves (d. 1942) opened a medical practice in Scottsville in 1915, including opening a modern hospital/infirmary with beds for 15 patients, the Graves Infirmary, at 217 Main St.  Dr. Pellie saw patients there and also at his home, which he purchased in 1917;  Dr. Lattie saw patients there and at another office on East Main Street.

References

National Register of Historic Places in Allen County, Kentucky
Scottsville, Kentucky
American Craftsman architecture in Kentucky
Prairie School architecture in Kentucky